In mathematical finance, the Cheyette Model is a quasi-Gaussian, quadratic volatility model of interest rates intended to overcome certain limitations of the Heath-Jarrow-Morton framework.  
By imposing a special time dependent structure on the forward rate volatility function, the Cheyette approach allows for dynamics which are Markovian, in contrast to the general HJM model.
This in turn allows the application of standard econometric valuation concepts.

External links and references

 Cheyette, O. (1994). Markov representation of the Heath-Jarrow-Morton model (working paper). Berkeley: BARRA Inc.
 Chibane, M. and Law, D. (2013). A quadratic volatility Cheyette model, Risk.net

Financial models
Mathematical finance
Fixed income analysis
Heath–Jarrow–Morton framework